The CONMEBOL–CAF play-off of the 2008 Women's Olympic Football Tournament qualification competition was a single-legged knockout match that decided one spot in the Olympic football tournament in China. The play-off was contested by the runners-up from CONMEBOL, Brazil, and the runners-up from CAF, Ghana. Brazil won the match 5–1 to qualify for their fourth successive Olympic football tournament.

Qualified teams

Summary
The play-off took place on 19 April 2008 in a single, one-off match at the Workers' Stadium in Beijing, China (a neutral venue).

|}

Match

Goalscorers

References

External links
Olympic Football Tournaments Beijing 2008 – Women, FIFA.com
Brazil squad
Ghana squad

Women play-off
Brazil women's national football team matches
Ghana women's national football team matches
April 2008 sports events in Asia
2008 in Brazilian women's football
2007–08 in Ghanaian football
2008